Fairview Township is the name of some places in the U.S. state of Minnesota:

 Fairview Township, Cass County, Minnesota
 Fairview Township, Lyon County, Minnesota

See also 
 Fairview Township (disambiguation)

Minnesota township disambiguation pages